The GSAT (Geosynchronous Satellite) satellites are India's indigenously developed communications satellites, used for digital audio, data and video broadcasting. As of 5 December 2018, 20 GSAT satellites of ISRO have been launched out of which 14 satellites are in service.

History 
The GSAT series of geosynchronous satellites is a system developed by ISRO with an objective to make India self-reliant in broadcasting services. The repertoire of 10 GSAT satellites, a total of 168 transponders (out of which 95 transponders are leased out to provide services to the broadcasters) in the C, Extended C and Ku-bands provides services to telecommunications, television broadcasting, weather forecasting, disaster warning and search and rescue operations.

List of active satellites 
This is a list of GSAT current satellites with their outcome.

List of upcoming GSAT satellites

List of defunct satellites

See also 

 Polar Satellite Launch Vehicle (PSLV)
 Geosynchronous Satellite Launch Vehicle (GSLV)
 List of Indian satellites
 List of Satish Dhawan Space Centre launches

References

External links 
 ISRO GeoStationary Satellites

 
INSAT satellites
ISRO satellites
ISRO programs
Communications satellites of India
Communications satellite constellations